Buchheit is a surname. Notable people with the surname include:

George Buchheit (1898–1972), American basketball coach
Gérard Buchheit (born 1948), French middle-distance runner
Marisa Buchheit (born 1990), American singer and beauty pageant winner
Markus Buchheit, German member of the European parliament
Michael Buchheit (born 1967), German rower
Paul Buchheit, American computer programmer and software developer